is a Japanese braised pork dish which literally means "square simmered".

Kakuni is a popular regional cuisine (meibutsu) of Kyushu, particularly Nagasaki. This particular dish is most likely originated from the famous Chinese dish Dongpo Pork, making it a form of Japanese Chinese cuisine, although the gravy is less heavy than its origin. During the Ming Dynasty and Song Dynasty, the main Sino-Japanese trading route existed between Hangzhou and Kyūshū. Many Chinese lived in major port cities in Kyushu, such as Nagasaki; likewise  many Japanese lived in Hangzhou. Therefore, pork was popularized in major Kyushu cities.

The Okinawan regional variation is called Rafute.

Preparation
Kakuni is made of thick cubes of pork belly simmered in dashi, soy sauce, mirin, sugar, and sake. By cooking it for a long time over a low temperature the collagen breaks-down into gelatin keeping the meat moist while becoming extremely tender allowing it to be consumed with chopsticks easily. The dish is often served with scallions, daikon and karashi.

See also

References

Japanese Chinese cuisine
Japanese cuisine
Pork dishes